The 2022–23 season of Gyöngyösi KK (known as HE-DO B. Braun Gyöngyös for sponsorship reasons) was the 12th consecutive season in the top flight of Hungarian handball. The club will participate in Nemzeti Bajnokság I and the Magyar Kupa.

Players

Squad information
Squad for the 2022–23 season. 

Goalkeepers
 12  Aleksandar Tomić
 16  László Bartucz
 32  Barnabás Gyánti
Left Wingers
 15  Milán Varsandán
 45  Bercel Gyallai
 95  Máté Menyhárt
Right Wingers
 20  Máté Gábori
 21  Máté Lakosy
Line Players 
 19  Márk Hegedűs
 26  Tibor Gerdán (c)
 57  Norbert Jóga

Left Backs
7  Dávid Nkousa
 10  Levente Halász
 51  Dino Hamidović
Central Backs
9  Martin Potisk
 24  Péter Schmid
 55  Martin Gráf
Right Backs
 11  Olivér Jaros
 18  Lucian Bura
 44  Zsolt Schäffer

Transfers
Source: Rajt a K&H férfi ligában

 IN
  László Bartucz (from  Tatabánya)  Lucian Bura (from  Gorica)  Norbert Jóga (from  Komlói BSK)  Máté Lakosy (from  ETO-SZESE Győr)  Máté Menyhárt (from  Kecskemét)  Martin Potisk (from  ThSV Eisenach)  Zsolt Schäffer (from  Csurgó)  Péter Schmid (from  Budakalász) Head coach:  Balázs Bíró (from  Salgótarján) OUT
  Ľubomír Ďuriš (to  MŠK Považská Bystrica)   Pál Merkovszki (to  Budai Farkasok)  Mitar Markez (to  Csurgó)  Benedek Nagy (loan to  Tatabánya)  Bence Papp (to  Budakalász)  Dávid Ubornyák (to  Tatabánya)   Uroš Vilovski (to  Tatabánya)   Marko Vasić (to  Vojvodina)  Bálint Rosta (loan to  ETO-SZESE Győr)Staff members
Source: Staff - Szakmai stáb 2022-2023

 Head Coach: Balázs Bíró
 Assistant Coach:  Ákos Sándor
 Goalkeeping Coach: Henrik Hudák
 Fitness Coach: Tamás Németh
 Club Doctor: János Szívós MD
 Masseur: Balázs Unger

Club

Management
Source: Management (Elnökség)

Uniform
Supplier: hummel
Shirt sponsor (front): B. Braun / tippmix / HE-DO / Kedvenc Kereskedőház / K&V
Shirt sponsor (back): City of Gyöngyös
Shorts sponsor: Crossgym Gemmeopolis / MÁTRAKÖZMŰ Mélyépítő Kft. / tippmix

Competitions
Times up to 30 October 2022 and from 26 March 2023 are CEST (UTC+2). Times from 30 October 2022 to 26 March 2023 are CET (UTC+1).

Overview

Nemzeti Bajnokság I

Regular season

Results by round

Matches
The league fixtures were announced on 5 July 2022.FÉRFI KÉZILABDA NB I, 2022–2023

Results overview

Magyar Kupa

Gyöngyös entered the tournament in the fourth round.

Statistics

Top scorers
Includes all competitive matches. The list is sorted by shirt number when total goals are equal. Last updated on 18 September 2022.''

References

External links
 

 
Gyöngyösi KK